The 1981 All-Ireland Minor Hurling Championship was the 51st staging of the All-Ireland Minor Hurling Championship since its establishment by the Gaelic Athletic Association in 1928.

Tipperary entered the championship as the defending champions, however, they were beaten by Clare in the Munster final.

On 6 September 1981 Kilkenny won the championship following a 1-20 to 3-9 defeat of Galway in the All-Ireland final. This was their 12th All-Ireland title and their first in four championship seasons.

Results

Leinster Minor Hurling Championship

Final

Munster Minor Hurling Championship

First round

Semi-finals

Final

All-Ireland Minor Hurling Championship

Semi-final

Final

External links
 All-Ireland Minor Hurling Championship: Roll Of Honour

Minor
All-Ireland Minor Hurling Championship